The Marylebone Cricket Club Grounds (MCC Grounds for short) is a Belizean football stadium, located on the Northside of Belize City, Belize.

Football 
It has traditionally been the homefield of all Belize City clubs that participate in national and international competitions. It is currently being occupied by FC Belize of the Premier League of Belize (PLB).

It also plays host to primary school and high school football competitions.

History 
The Grounds opened in the 1950s on the site known as the Barracks and was named after an English cricket team (Belize was a British colony). The MCC has since played host to numerous matches between City teams and visitors in the Belize Premier Football League, now the Premier League of Belize, and competitions sponsored by UNCAF and CONCACAF.

Belize Premier Football League home stadiums
Football venues in Belize City
Buildings and structures in Belize City
1950s establishments in British Honduras
Sports venues completed in the 1950s